The following is a list of St. Francis Terriers men's basketball head coaches. The Terriers have had 22 coaches in their 112-season history. The team is currently coached by Glenn Braica.

References

St. Francis Brooklyn

St. Francis Brooklyn Terriers basketball, men's, coaches
St. Francis Brooklyn Terriers basketball head coaches